Ectoedemia haraldi is a moth of the family Nepticulidae. It is found in the Mediterranean Region from the Iberian Peninsula and southern France to Greece. It is also found on Corsica and Crete.

The wingspan is 5.8-7.1 mm. Adults are on wing from April to June. There is one generation per year.

The larvae feed on Quercus coccifera, Quercus ilex, Quercus ilex rotundifolia and Quercus suber. They mine the leaves of their host plant. The mine consists of a straight corridor. The frass is black and is concentrated in a broad band that almost entirely fills the corridor.

External links
Fauna Europaea
bladmineerders.nl
A Taxonomic Revision Of The Western Palaearctic Species Of The Subgenera Zimmermannia Hering And Ectoedemia Busck s.str. (Lepidoptera, Nepticulidae), With Notes On Their Phylogeny

Nepticulidae
Moths of Europe
Moths described in 1942